Senator Torres may refer to:

Aníbal José Torres (fl. 2000s–2010s), Senate of Puerto Rico
Art Torres (born 1946), California State Senate
Carlos J. Torres Torres (born 1967), Senate of Puerto Rico
Cynthia Torres (1911–2001), Senate of Guam
Norma Torres (born 1965), California State Senate
Ralph Torres (born 1979), Senate of the Northern Mariana Islands